Aluminium boride may refer to 
Aluminium diboride, AlB2
Aluminium dodecaboride, AlB12